Rupert Eidler (born 6 February 1898, date of death unknown) was an Austrian weightlifter. He competed in the men's middleweight event at the 1924 Summer Olympics.

References

External links
 

1898 births
Year of death missing
Austrian male weightlifters
Olympic weightlifters of Austria
Weightlifters at the 1924 Summer Olympics
Place of birth missing
Date of death unknown
20th-century Austrian people